Mera Dard Na Janay Koi  is a Pakistani romantic soap that premiered on 14 October 2015 on Hum TV and aired Monday to Thursday evenings. It is directed by Saima Waseem, written by Saima Akram Chaudhry and produced by Momina Duraid under her home production.

Plot
The series explores the story of three families. Bilal has three sisters and is in love with Maira, his cousin. Maira's dad also wants Bilal to be his son-in-law because Bilal is the son of his sister. Bilal's eldest sister returns to her maika and says that her husband and his family abuses her because she cannot have a baby, so she left her susral. Her mother got angry that Shiza her younger sister is unmarried and now you have come. While Haris is in love with Shiza. But his step-mother and step sister, Ramla do not want him to marry Shiza. Ramla is jealous of her. Maira and Bilal marry each other but family issues arise. They do not accept Maira, since she cannot produce a child. She is abused and finally their house. 
Aapa and Amma find a girl, Zartashia and marry her with Bilal. Soon they get fed up of her because she is badtameez and she also could not produce a child. Again, they want Bilal to divorce his current wife. Shiza and Haris also marry. Ramla stole their diamond ring and put it on. She also told her Aani about it. One day, when the whole family was at the dinner table, Haris sees the ring on Ramla's finger. She and Aani said that it is not Shiza's. Aani bought it for Ramla. Haris said that the design was the same. But they refused.  Then he and Shiza go on a vacation out of the country. At home Ramla and Aani were responsible for their children. Ramla plays a trick and kills Shiza's daughter. Heartbroken Haris and Shiza, when told about the death of their daughter return to Pakistan. Zartashia finds the medical report of Bilal and comes to know that problem was in Bilal, that she and Maira, could not produce.
Bilal finds out that Zartashia is having affair. He yells at Zartashia and tells her that he knows the truth. So Zartashia also says that Bilal was the one with the problem and cannot have children. Aapa and Ammi find out and stare at each other. Ammi and Bilal married Aapa off. But she is again divorced because he knew that Aapa's youngest sister is flirting with someone. Amma cries that she is so unlucky that one daughter cannot marry, son cannot have children, other daughter's beti died and youngest is having an affair. Amma then goes to her brother's house and asks Maira’s hand in marriage. Maira and Bilal get married again and live happily ever after.

Cast
 Sabreen Hisbani as Hina
 Wahaj Ali as Bilal 
 Faria Sheikh as Maira  
 Shahvar Ali Khan as Harris
 Aleezay Tahir as Shiza
 Shermeen Ali as Ramla 
 Shaista Jabeen as Hina bilal hira and shiza's mother  
 Sara Razi as Hira
 Erum Azam as Saima
 Sajida Syed as Aliya Begum
 Saman Ansari as Sarwat Randhawa
 Mehmood Akhtar as Randhawa

References

External links

 Official Website 

Hum TV
Hum Network Limited
Hum TV original programming
Urdu-language television shows
Pakistani drama television series
Serial drama television series
2015 Pakistani television series debuts
2016 Pakistani television series endings
Television series about dysfunctional families
Television series set in Lahore
Television series set in Punjab, Pakistan